Walter Nicholas Murray Lawrence (born 8 February 1935) is an English former first-class cricketer and financier.

Lawrence was born at Marylebone to Henry Walter Neville Lawrence (son of Sir Walter Roper Lawrence, 1st Baronet) and his wife, Sarah Butler. He was educated at Winchester College, before going up to Trinity College, Oxford. While studying at Oxford he made his debut in first-class cricket for Oxford University against Middlesex at Oxford in 1954. He made two further first-class appearances in 1954, playing once more for Oxford University against Hampshire County Cricket Club, and for the Free Foresters against Oxford University. After graduating from Oxford, he entered into business as an underwriter. He married Sally Louise O'Dwyer in 1962, with the couple having two children. He was the chairman of Lloyd's of London from 1988–1990.

References

External links

1935 births
Living people
People from Marylebone
People educated at Winchester College
Alumni of Trinity College, Oxford
English cricketers
Oxford University cricketers
Free Foresters cricketers
Insurance underwriters
English businesspeople